Mohamed Salah Amin (born 31 August 1947) is an Egyptian boxer. He competed in the men's featherweight event at the 1972 Summer Olympics.

References

External links

1947 births
Living people
Egyptian male boxers
Olympic boxers of Egypt
Boxers at the 1972 Summer Olympics
Place of birth missing (living people)
Mediterranean Games medalists in boxing
Featherweight boxers
Mediterranean Games gold medalists for Egypt
Mediterranean Games bronze medalists for Egypt
Competitors at the 1971 Mediterranean Games
20th-century Egyptian people
21st-century Egyptian people